Youngistaan is a 2014 Indian Hindi-language political film directed by Syed Ahmad Afzal. It stars Jackky Bhagnani, Neha Sharma and Farooq Sheikh with Kayoze Irani appears in a special appearance and Boman Irani appears in a cameo appearance. The film is a love story set against the backdrop of Indian politics. It marked the posthumous appearance of Sheikh following his death on 28 December 2013.

Sheikh's performance as Akbar Patel was notably praised.

Plot 

Youngistaan is a love story set in the backdrop of Indian politics. It is the story of Abhimanyu Kaul and the love of his life, Anwita Chauhan.

Abhimanyu Kaul, a young man living an ordinary life in Japan, finds himself in the political spotlight due to the sudden death of his father, the Prime Minister of India. Abhimanyu struggles to balance his complicated personal relationships with the political resistance against him from his own party. Being a public figure, by reluctantly accepting to represent the governing party, much against his own wishes and at the cost of his private life, is a double-edged sword that Abhimanyu must walk on.

Thought of as an amateur and incapable of handling the issues at large by one and all (except the ever-faithful Akbar Patel, Secretary to the P.M.), the story closes as a victorious Abhimanyu changes the course of events and turns the tide his way, through his hard work, honesty, and above all, a political legacy – a sharp, leading mind that not everyone inherits.

Cast 

Jackky Bhagnani as Abhimanyu Kaul/Abhi
Neha Sharma as Anvita Chauhan, Abhimanyu's love interest
Farooq Sheikh as Akbar Uncle
Prakash Belawadi as Murli Mukundan
Deepankar De as Shubhodeep Ganguly popularly known as Shubho Da (president of ABKP Party, interim prime minister and later president)
Brijendra Kala as Kulfi/Alcohol Vendor
Mita Vashisht as Suhasini Singh Deo
Triveni Sangam Bahuguna as Ajay Thakur
Nilesh Rai as Nilesh
Kayoze Irani as Zafar, Abhimanyu's colleague in Japan (Special appearance)
Boman Irani as Dashrath Kaul, Abhimanyu's late father and deceased prime minister of India (Cameo appearance)
Shah Rukh Khan in an archive appearance in 2005 film Silsiilay

Production and promotion 
While the first schedule of the film took place in Indore, Lucknow and overseas – the second schedule was held at the Taj Mahal in Agra, where a campaign titled Yo Youngistan Go Youngistan was launched.

The first trailer of Youngistaan was unveiled at a suburban multiplex in Mumbai on 1 February 2014.

Critical reception 

Shubha Shetty-Saha of Mid-Day gave 2.5 out of 5 stars stating, "While the movie has a very interesting premise, it is totally diluted by lazy scriptwriting and sketchy direction."
Shubhra Gupta of The Indian Express rated it 2 out of 5 stars and stated "The film, despite its efforts, becomes muddled, and dull."

Anupama Chopra of Hindustan Times rated the film 1 out of 5 stars saying "Youngistaan is brain-dead and insufferable."
Paloma Sharma of Rediff.com rated the film 1 out of 5 stars saying "Youngistaan neither says something new nor does it reinforce time-tested wisdom in a way that you actually want to pay attention to it."

Box office 
Youngistaan opened to a "low" occupancy of 5–10% on the first day of its release across 1000 theatres in India with the other two releases of the day: Dishkiyaoon and O Teri.

According to exhibitor Rajesh Thadani, "Youngistaan raked in Rs 40 million during the first weekend." On its first Monday, the film saw a sharp decline in its gross collection earning in the range of 7.5 million, thus taking its domestic total up to a cumulative of 48.0 million at the box office. The film was a Box office bomb.

Music 

Music was composed by Jeet Gannguli (Suno Na Sangemarmar, Suno Na Sangemarmar (Remix)), Sneha Khanwalkar (Tanki (Mika Version) and Tanki (Bhaven Version)), Shiraz Uppal (Daata Di Divaani, Mere Khuda), and Shree Isshq (Youngistaan Anthem, Youngistaan Anthem Remix) whilst the background score were composed by Salim–Sulaiman. Lyrics were penned by Sanamjeet, Syed Ahmad Afzal, Hard Kaur, Sneha Khanwalkar, Jackky Bhagnani, Kausar Munir and Sonny Ravan.

Awards and nominations

Sequel 

The makers have announced a sequel titled Youngistaan dobara, which would narrate the story after Jackky Bhagnani's character becomes prime minister.

References

External links 
 

Columbia Pictures films
2014 films
2010s Hindi-language films
Films shot in Lucknow
Films scored by Sneha Khanwalkar
Films scored by Shiraz Uppal
Films scored by Jeet Ganguly
Sony Pictures Networks India films
Sony Pictures films